GIAA may refer to:
 Antonio B. Won Pat International Airport
 God Is an Astronaut, an Irish band
 Guild of Italian American Actors, United States
 Government Internal Audit Agency, an executive agency of the government of the United Kingdom